Youth is a 1917 American silent drama film directed by Romaine Fielding and starring Carlyle Blackwell, June Elvidge and Johnny Hines.

Cast
 Carlyle Blackwell as Bryan Goodwin 
 June Elvidge as Jean Elliott 
 Johnny Hines as Kamura 
 George Cowl as Henry Elliott 
 Muriel Ostriche as Grace Van Seer 
 Robert Broderick as James Goodwin 
 Victor Kennard as Murray Bronson 
 Henrietta Simpson as Mrs. Van Seer 
 Henry West as Dougherty

References

Bibliography
 Ann Catherine Paietta & Jean L. Kauppila. Health Professionals on Screen. Scarecrow Press, 1999.

External links
 

1917 films
1917 drama films
1910s English-language films
American silent feature films
Silent American drama films
Films directed by Romaine Fielding
American black-and-white films
World Film Company films
1910s American films